Chan-young, Chan-yeong, or Chan-yong is a Korean masculine given name. The meaning differs based on the hanja used to write each syllable of the name. There are 20 hanja with the reading "Chan" and 34 hanja with the reading "young" on the South Korean government's official list of hanja which may be registered for use in given names.

People with this name include:

 Kim Chan-young (born 1989), South Korean footballer
 Park Chan-young (handballer) (born 1983), South Korean handball player
 Park Chan-young (footballer) (born 1986), South Korean football player
 Yoon Chan-young (born 2001), South Korean actor
 Kim Chan-young (born 2000), South Korean rapper and member of D-Crunch
 Lee Chan-young (born 1970), South Korean actor
 Park Chan-yong (born 1963), South Korean boxer

See also
 List of Korean given names

References

Korean masculine given names